Elizabeth Hadley Richardson (November 9, 1891 – January 22, 1979) was the first wife of American author Ernest Hemingway. The two married in 1921 after a courtship of less than a year, and moved to Paris within months of being married. In Paris, Hemingway pursued a writing career, and through him Hadley met other expatriate American and British writers.

In 1925, Hadley learned of Hemingway's affair with Pauline Pfeiffer. Pfeiffer had been Hadley's best friend and had lived and traveled with the Hemingways. Hadley divorced Hemingway in 1927. In 1933, Hadley married a second time, to journalist Paul Mowrer, whom she met in Paris.

Early life 
Elizabeth Hadley Richardson was born on November 9, 1891, in St. Louis, Missouri, the youngest of five children. Hadley's mother, Florence Wyman-Richardson, was an accomplished musician and singer, and her father James Richardson Jr., worked for a family-owned pharmaceutical company. As a child, Hadley fell out of a second-story window and consequently was bed-ridden for a year. After the accident, her mother became overly protective, not allowing Hadley to learn how to swim or engage in other physical activities. Hadley's father was less protective, but in 1903 he died by suicide in response to financial difficulties.

As a teenager, Hadley became painfully shy and reclusive. She attended Mary Institute in St. Louis, and then attended college at Bryn Mawr. However, when her mother decided Hadley was "too delicate, both physically and emotionally," she left college. The death of her sister Dorothea in an apartment fire earlier that year may have contributed to Hadley's decision to leave college. Hemingway scholar Jamie Barlowe believes Hadley represented a "True Woman" as opposed to a "New Woman" of the early 20th century. The "True Woman" was "emotional, dependent, gentle—a true follower."

After her return from college, Hadley lived a restricted life—her sister and her mother continued to worry about her health—with little opportunity for physical activity or much of a social life. Her mother did allow Hadley to visit her former Bryn Mawr roommate Edna Rapallo in Vermont one summer. While visiting her friend, she enjoyed playing tennis, and she met Maxfield Parrish, but when her mother became worried over her well-being, she was forced to return home. While her mother became reclusive and immersed herself in spiritualism, Hadley spent some years attempting to attain a career as a pianist, until she abandoned music, believing she lacked talent. She later did perform weekly in a church. When her mother developed Bright's Disease, Hadley nursed her until her death.

Ernest Hemingway

Shortly after her mother's death, in December 1920, Hadley visited her old roommate Kate Smith (who later married John Dos Passos) in Chicago, and through her met Hemingway, who was living with Smith's brother and was employed as an associate editor of the monthly journal Cooperative Commonwealth.  When Hadley returned to St. Louis, Hemingway, who became infatuated with her, wrote "I knew she was the girl I was going to marry." Hadley, eight years older than Hemingway, was red-haired, with a "nurturing instinct." Bernice Kert, author of The Hemingway Women, claims Hadley was "evocative" of the woman whom Hemingway met and fell in love with during his recuperation from injuries during World War I, Agnes von Kurowsky, but in Hadley, Hemingway saw a childishness Agnes lacked.

During the winter of 1921, Hadley took up her music again and indulged in outdoor activities. She and Hemingway corresponded during the winter. When she expressed misgivings about their age difference, he "protested that it made no difference at all." Hemingway visited her in St. Louis in March 1921, and two weeks later she visited him in Chicago. Then, they did not see each other for two months until he returned to St. Louis in May. In their correspondence, she promised to buy him a Corona typewriter for his birthday. In June, she announced her engagement despite objections to the marriage from his friends and her sister. Hadley believed she knew what she was doing, and more importantly, she had an inheritance with which to support herself and a husband. She believed in Hemingway's talent and believed "she was right for him."

They were married on September 3, 1921, in Bay Township, Michigan and spent their honeymoon at the Hemingway family summer cottage on Walloon Lake. The weather was miserable, and both Hadley and Hemingway came down with fever, sore throat, and cough. The couple returned to Chicago after their honeymoon, where they lived in a small apartment on North Dearborn Street.

The death of a hated uncle gave Hadley another inheritance and additional financial independence for the couple. Initially, they intended to visit Rome, but Sherwood Anderson convinced them to visit Paris instead. Anderson's advice to live in Paris interested her, and when two months later Hemingway was hired as foreign correspondent for the Toronto Star, the couple left for Paris. Of Hemingway's marriage to Hadley, Hemingway biographer Jeffrey Meyers claims: "With Hadley, Hemingway achieved everything he had hoped for with Agnes: the love of a beautiful woman, a comfortable income, a life in Europe."

Paris 
In Paris, Hadley and Hemingway lived in a small apartment at 74, rue du Cardinal Lemoine in the Latin Quarter. That winter , he discovered the Shakespeare and Company bookshop, which also functioned as a lending library, and was run by American expatriate Sylvia Beach. Hadley went there to buy James Joyce's works, which she liked, because Beach had published Joyce's Ulysses.  The Hemingways first met Joyce at the book shop in March 1922.

Through Anderson's letters of introduction, Hemingway met Ezra Pound, who invited the couple for tea, and they were invited to Gertrude Stein's salon. Stein  in turn visited the young couple in their apartment. Hemingway's and Stein's relationship turned hostile after Hemingway gained fame (see Hemingway's Boat, Paul Hendrickson, 2011, and Hemingway, Kenneth Lynn, 1987). That spring, Hadley and Hemingway traveled to Italy and, in the summer, to Germany. Hadley went alone to Geneva in December 1922 to meet Hemingway who was covering a peace conference. It was during this trip, while waiting for a train at the Gare de Lyon, that Hadley misplaced and lost a suitcase filled with Hemingway's manuscripts.  Devastated and angry at the loss of his work, he blamed her.

A few months later, when they learned Hadley was pregnant, the couple decided to move to Toronto for the child's birth. Before they left, the couple went for the first time to watch the bullfighting and the running of the bulls at the Festival of San Fermín in Pamplona. Their son John Hadley Nicanor Hemingway was born on October 10, 1923, in Toronto. He was named for his mother Hadley and for the young Spanish matador Nicanor Villalta, who had impressed Hemingway the previous summer. The baby was healthy, and the birth quick; Hemingway missed it, as he had been sent to New York on assignment, and was returning on a train when his wife went into labor. Hadley nicknamed the infant Bumby.

In Toronto, the family lived in a small apartment on Bathurst Street with "wall space enough to hang their collection of paintings." Hadley called the assignments given to her husband at the Toronto Star "absurd." Hemingway considered Toronto boring and wanted to return to Paris to the life of a writer rather than live the life of a Toronto journalist. When Bumby was only a few months old, they returned to Paris, and in January 1924 moved into a new apartment on Rue Notre Dame des Champs. Hadley hired a woman to help with housework and with Bumby, and borrowed a pram to take the baby on walks in the Luxembourg Gardens. Bumby's christening was held at St. Luke's Episcopal Church in March with "Chink" Dorman-Smith and Gertrude Stein as godparents. A few months later, mismanagement of her funds left Hadley with a financial loss, and at the same time, Hemingway started work as an editor for Ezra Pound and Ford Madox Ford's small modernist magazine the Transatlantic Review. In June, Hadley and Hemingway went again to Pamplona, leaving Bumby in Paris, and that winter, they went for the first time to Austria to vacation in Schruns.

Sometime after their return to Paris from Canada, Hemingway met the Pfeiffer sisters. When in June 1925 Hemingway and Hadley left Paris for their annual visit to Pamplona—the third year they had done so—they were accompanied by a group of American and British expatriates, including Pauline Pfeiffer. The trip inspired Hemingway's first novel The Sun Also Rises, which he began to write immediately after the fiesta, finishing it in September. In November, as a birthday present for Hadley, Hemingway bought Joan Miró's painting The Farm.

Divorce 
Their marriage disintegrated as Hemingway was writing and revising The Sun Also Rises, although he dedicated the novel to "Hadley and ...John Hadley Nicanor." For the second year, they went to  Schruns for Christmas, but that year they were joined by Pauline Pfeiffer. Hemingway returned with Pfeiffer to Paris, leaving Hadley with Bumby in Austria. While Hadley was in Austria, Hemingway sailed to New York then returned to Paris in March, at which time he may have begun his affair with Pauline. In the spring of 1926, Hadley became aware of the affair, although she endured Pauline's presence in Pamplona that July. On their return to Paris, Hadley and Hemingway decided to separate, and Hadley formally requested a divorce in the fall. By November they had split their possessions, and Hadley accepted Hemingway's offer of the royalties from The Sun Also Rises. The couple divorced in January 1927, and Hemingway married Pauline Pfeiffer in May the same year.

Paul Mowrer 
Hadley stayed in France until 1934. Among her many friends in Paris was Paul Mowrer, foreign correspondent for the Chicago Daily News, whom she had met in the spring of 1927, not long after her divorce was finalized. A journalist and political writer, in 1929 Mowrer won the Pulitzer Prize. On July 3, 1933, after a five-year courtship, Hadley and Paul Mowrer were married in London. Hadley was especially grateful for Mowrer's warm relationship with Bumby. Not long after the two married, they moved back to the U.S. to Lake Bluff, Illinois, a suburb of Chicago, where they lived during World War II. She continued to receive royalties from The Sun Also Rises, which included the royalties for the 1957 film.

A Moveable Feast 
Hemingway's memoir A Moveable Feast, not published until 1964, three years after Hemingway's death, captures Hemingway's marriage to Hadley and their life together in Paris during the early to mid-1920s.

Later years and death 
When Hadley left her marriage to Hemingway, she left the limelight. She reportedly saw Hemingway only twice after their divorce. In July 1939, she and Mowrer ran into him while vacationing in Wyoming, and, according to A.E. Hotchner, the last time Hemingway reported seeing Hadley was after a brief and spontaneous meeting in Paris.

Hadley died on January 22, 1979, in Lakeland, Florida, at the age of 87. She is buried in New Hampshire at Chocorua Cemetery in Tamworth.

In 1992, Hadley by Gioia Diliberto, a biography of Hadley Richardson, was published. The book, which is based on extensive research, including the author's exclusive access to a series of taped conversations with Richardson, was reissued in 2011 as Paris Without End: The True Story of Hemingway's First Wife.

In 2011, a book titled The Paris Wife: A Novel by Paula McLain was published, telling the entire story of Hadley Richardson's relationship with Hemingway in "her voice." Although a work of fiction, its narrative is faithful to the known facts.

References

Footnotes

Sources

Further reading
Diliberto, Gioia: Hadley Ticknor & Fields, New York, 1992, reprinted as Paris Without End: The True Story of Hemingway's Wife HarperCollins, New York, 2011
Sokoloff, Alice Hunt: Hadley – The First Mrs. Hemingway, New York (1973)
 McLain, Paula. The Paris Wife, Random House. (2011)

External links

Michael Palin's Hemingway Adventure, Paris, Hadley (PBS)

1891 births
1979 deaths
R
People from St. Louis
American expatriates in France